Aaron Shawn Estes (born February 18, 1973) is a former Major League Baseball pitcher.

High school
Estes attended Douglas High School in Minden, Nevada. As a senior in 1991, he was named Gatorade's Nevada State Baseball Player of the Year and finished with a 0.79 earned run average and 141 strikeouts in 61.2 innings pitched. At the plate, he hit .488 with eight home runs. He would go on to be enshrined in the Nevada Interscholastic Activities Association Hall of Fame in 2016.

Estes initially committed to play college baseball at Stanford University but instead signed with the Seattle Mariners after being selected in the first round of the 1991 MLB Draft.

Minor leagues
Estes began his professional career with the Bellingham Mariners in "A" ball in 1991. He then played with the Appleton Foxes, Arizona League Mariners and Wisconsin Timber Rattlers from 1992-1995. The Mariners traded Estes to the San Francisco Giants on May 21, 1995 for Salomón Torres.

The Giants moved Estes through their farm system rapidly during the 1995 season, sending him to the Burlington Bees, San Jose Giants and Shreveport Captains.

Major league career

San Francisco Giants
Estes made his Major League debut with the Giants on September 16, 1995, working 5.1 innings as a starter against the Pittsburgh Pirates. He allowed five earned runs and collected the loss. He was 0-3 in three starts for the Giants that September.

Estes returned to the minors to start the 1996 season with the Phoenix Firebirds, but was recalled to the Majors to start a game against the rival Los Angeles Dodgers on July 13. Estes worked seven shutout innings to record his first career victory.

He was selected to the NL All-Star team during this season.

On May 24, 2000, Estes became the first pitcher in Giants' franchise history to hit a grand slam since Monte Kennedy in 1949.

New York Mets
The Giants traded Estes to the New York Mets on December 16, 2001 for Desi Relaford and Tsuyoshi Shinjo. The Mets signed him to a $6.2 million contract, avoiding arbitration. On June 15, 2002, Estes found himself at the center of a controversy when he started against the New York Yankees against Roger Clemens. In 2000, Clemens had beaned Mets catcher Mike Piazza, followed by the incident in Game 2 of the 2000 World Series in which Clemens threw a broken bat at Piazza. With the fans standing in anticipation of the showdown, Estes' first pitch was a fastball that was about a foot behind Clemens. Estes would hit a two-run homer off Clemens in the fifth inning of the eventual 8-0 Mets win, setting off a loud roar from the sellout crowd of 54,347 and derisive chants of "Ro-ger! Ro-ger!"

Estes would ultimately start 23 games for the Mets, with a record of 4-9 and a 4.55 ERA, before he was traded again on August 15 to the Cincinnati Reds for Brady Clark, Raul González, Elvin Andújar and Pedro Feliciano.

Cincinnati Reds
He pitched in six games for the Reds, finishing 1-3 with a 7.71 ERA.

Chicago Cubs
Estes signed a 1-year deal with the Cubs in 2003. He was moved to the bullpen towards September due to his struggles on the mound. However, on September 24 with the Cubs holding a one-game lead over the Houston Astros, Estes pitched a complete-game shutout en route to an 8-0 Cubs win at Cincinnati. Three days later, the Cubs wrapped up the division. He ultimately finished the season with a record of 8-11, 5.73 ERA in 28 starts.

Colorado Rockies
Estes signed a minor league deal with the Colorado Rockies in 2004. He was named the Opening Day starter. He beat Randy Johnson on Opening Day 6-2, pitching 7 innings while allowing just 2 runs on 2 hits.

He would enjoy his first winning season since the year 2000, finishing the season with a record of 15–8 in 34 starts, despite his 5.84 ERA being the highest among qualified starters.

Arizona Diamondbacks
Estes again signed a 1-year deal with the Arizona Diamondbacks in 2005, following his stint the previous season with the Rockies. He was placed on the DL in July with a stress fracture in his left ankle. His season was cut short and he finished the season with a record of (7-8, 4.80 in 21 starts).

San Diego Padres
Estes signed a one-year deal with the San Diego Padres for the 2006 season but made only one start before he was lost for the  season due to Tommy John surgery.

Estes began his  comeback with minor league appearances in  Single-A, though he was soon promoted to Triple-A Portland. After his first start in Portland, Estes reaggravated his injured pitching elbow. He was placed on the disabled list retroactive to August 6.

On May 8, Estes finally returned to the Majors after missing most of the previous two seasons with injuries. He started eight games for the Padres in 2008, finishing 2-3 with a 4.74 ERA. The Padres chose not to re-sign him after the season.

Los Angeles Dodgers
On January 9, Estes signed a one-year minor league deal with the Los Angeles Dodgers with an invitation to spring training. He was expected to compete for the fifth starter position but pitched poorly in spring training games and was released on March 22. However, after thinking about his options, he decided to stay with the Dodgers and report to minor league camp to attempt to transition into a situational reliever The Dodgers assigned Estes to the AAA Albuquerque Isotopes to open the season, where he was 3-4 with a 3.08 ERA in 13 starts before announcing his retirement because he did not want to pitch in AAA.

Washington Nationals

On February 6, 2010, Estes signed a minor league contract with the Washington Nationals. On March 11, 2010, the Nationals released him. After his release from the Nationals, he retired from baseball.

Life after baseball 
On July 31, 2010, Estes was honored with a plaque on the Giants Wall of Fame along with former teammate Rich Aurilia.  Estes and Aurilia serve as co-hosts of Giants pregame and postgame shows on NBC Sports Bay Area. He is also an occasional fill-in analyst on Giants road game broadcasts, working alongside Duane Kuiper. 
Estes previously did television color commentary for the Reno Aces of the Pacific Coast League.

Personal life
Estes is married to Nathalie Evashevski Estes. They have four children and live in Arizona.

References

External links

1973 births
Living people
San Francisco Giants players
New York Mets players
Cincinnati Reds players
Chicago Cubs players
Colorado Rockies players
Arizona Diamondbacks players
San Diego Padres players
Baseball players from California
Major League Baseball pitchers
National League All-Stars
Sportspeople from San Bernardino, California
Bellingham Mariners players
Appleton Foxes players
Arizona League Mariners players
Wisconsin Timber Rattlers players
San Jose Giants players
Shreveport Captains players
Burlington Bees players
Phoenix Firebirds players
Bakersfield Blaze players
Fresno Grizzlies players
Tucson Sidewinders players
Arizona League Padres players
Lake Elsinore Storm players
Portland Beavers players
Albuquerque Isotopes players
Major League Baseball broadcasters
San Francisco Giants announcers
Minor League Baseball broadcasters